was a town located in Yamada District, Gunma Prefecture, Japan.

On March 27, 2006, Ōmama, along with the town of Kasakake (from Nitta District), and the village of Azuma (from Seta District), was merged to create the city of Midori.

External links
 Midori official website 

Dissolved municipalities of Gunma Prefecture
Midori, Gunma